The Alderman House (also known as the Royal Palm Antiques) is a historic house located at 2572 East First Street in Fort Myers, Florida. It is locally significant as an excellent example of the Mediterranean Revival style architecture in Fort Myers during the Florida Land Boom of the 1920s.

Description and history 
The stuccoed -story house was completed in 1925 in the Mediterranean Revival/Spanish Colonial Revival style of architecture. The house is currently the national headquarters for The Healthcare Television Network.

On December 1, 1988, it was added to the U.S. National Register of Historic Places.

References

External links

 Lee County listings at Florida's Office of Cultural and Historical Programs

Houses on the National Register of Historic Places in Florida
National Register of Historic Places in Lee County, Florida
Houses in Lee County, Florida
Buildings and structures in Fort Myers, Florida
1925 establishments in Florida
Houses completed in 1925
Mediterranean Revival architecture in Florida